Ottumwa is an unincorporated community in Haakon County, in the U.S. state of South Dakota.

History
A post office called Ottumwa was established in 1904, and remained in operation until 1983. The community takes its name from Ottumwa, Iowa, the native home of a share of the early settlers.

References

Unincorporated communities in Haakon County, South Dakota
Unincorporated communities in South Dakota